Polička is a town in Svitavy District in the Pardubice Region of the Czech Republic. It has about 8,700 inhabitants. The historic town centre is well preserved and is protected by law as an urban monument zone.

Administrative parts
Polička is made up of town parts of Polička-Město, Dolní Předměstí and Horní Předměstí, and villages of Lezník, Modřec and Střítež.

Etymology
Polička was founded in the area of meadows and forests called Napolickach, which most likely meant "on the plains", and the town's name was derived from this local name.

Geography
It lies in the Svitavy Uplands. It is situated on the borderline of historical lands of Bohemia and Moravia. The Bílý brook flows through the town and supplies Synský pond in the centre of the town.

History

Until 1200, the area was under the administration of the Praemonstratensian monastery in Litomyšl. Polička was founded in 1265 by King Ottokar II of Bohemia to defend the country's trading route from Moravia to Bohemia through dense forests. On 27 September 1265, Ottokar II issued a decree in which he ordered the lokator Conrad of Lewendorf to take care of setting up the new town.

In the first decades of its existence, the town was administered from the Svojanov Castle. In 1307, Polička was donated to Queen Elizabeth Richeza by her husband King Rudolf I and for next centuries became a dowry town, administered by Bohemian queens. During the reign of Charles IV, the town streets were paved, stone houses built, and the town fortified.

In 1421, Polička was taken by Jan Žižka and afterwards plundered by one of Hungarian armies of Sigismund. After the Hussite Wars, Germans were expelled and Polička became a purely Czech town.

16th–18th century

Polička enjoyed the favour of the Jagiellonian dynasty during their rule. Later, the town actively participated in the fight against Ferdinand I. In 1547 after Ferdinand I got to power, Polička was punished by suspension of its rights, fined, and its real estate was confiscated. Twelve years later, the town had to purchase the property for additional money.

In the second half of the 16th century, the town prospered and Renaissance-style buildings started to be built. including the Church of Saint Michael. In 1613, Polička was devastated by fire. Only the southwestern part of the town the Gothic town hall, church, rectory and school were spared. Polička did not prosper well during the Thirty Years' War either and was conquered and looted several times. The town subsequently depopulated.

Until the end of the 17th century, Polička recovered. In the 18th century, it again prospered and baroque reconstructions were made all over the town.

19th–20th century
Polička kept its baroque appearance until 1845 when it was hit by another fire, which destroyed most of the houses and the Church of Saint James the Great. The fire has considerably slowed development of the town and therefore the town walls were not torn down and are preserved to this day. During the second half of the 19th century the town experienced a significant cultural development. In 1896, Polička was connected to the national railway network. This started the industrial development of the town.

In the first half of the 20th century a number of significant building were built in the town, for example Tyl House, Sokol Gymnasium or the building of the current secondary grammar school. Until 1918, Polička was part of the Austrian monarchy (Austria side after the compromise of 1867), in the district of the same name, one of the 94 Bezirkshauptmannschaften in Bohemia. In October and November 1938 Polička was occupied by Nazi Germany. Between 1939 and 1945, the town belonged to the Protectorate of Bohemia and Moravia. After the World War II, the town lost about thousand inhabitants which left to the abandoned areas from where the original German population was expelled.

Demographics

Sights

The historic centre is formed by Palackého Square and adjacentr streets. The square includes one of the most notable Baroque town halls in the country. It replaced an old Gothic town hall and was built in 1739–1744. Both the town hall and the Marian column were probably designed by the architect František Maxmilián Kaňka.

Massive stone walls with 19 bastions are among the best-preserved fortifications in Central Europe.

The original Church of Saint James the Great was built in 1265. It was replaced by new church in the 1360s–1380s, which was later baroquely rocenstructed. After the fire in 1845, a new Neo-Gothic church was built on its site in 1853–1865. The tower of the church serves as a lookout point and contains the room in which the composer Bohuslav Martinů, the most notable person born in Polička, was born. It is open to the public.

The Church of Saint Michael was built before 1580. It is a Renaissance cemetery church with Gothic elements.

Notable people

Jewish pedigrees of Pol(l)itz(er), Pul(l)itz(er), etc.
Arne Novák (1880–1939), literary historian and critic; died here
Josef Šebestián Daubek (1842–1922), Czech-Austrian politician and entrepreneur
Antonín Eltschkner (1880–1961), priest and Esperantist
Bohuslav Martinů (1890–1959), classical composer
Martin Doktor (born 1974), sprint canoeist, Olympic champion
Kamila Vokoun Hájková (born 1987), ice dancer

Twin towns – sister cities

Polička is twinned with:
 Ebes, Hungary
 Hohenems, Austria

 Westerveld, Netherlands

Gallery

References

External links

Czech Radio article on Polička (in English)

Cities and towns in the Czech Republic
Populated places in Svitavy District
Shtetls
Populated places established in the 13th century
1265 establishments in Europe